Miguel Gomes (born 1972) is a Portuguese film director. He studied cinema at Lisbon Theatre and Film School (Escola Superior de Teatro e Cinema).

Biography
Trained at the Escola Superior de Teatro e Cinema (Superior School of Theatre and Film Lisbon), Gomes worked initially as a film critic and author of theoretical writings on cinema. His films include The Face You Deserve (2004), Our Beloved Month of August (2008) and Tabu (2012). 

Tabu was a winner of the Alfred Bauer Prize for Artistic Innovation and the FIPRESCI Jury Prize at the 2012 Berlin International Film Festival.

His 2015 film Arabian Nights was screened as part of the Directors' Fortnight section at the 2015 Cannes Film Festival.

Filmography

Short films 

 Christmas Inventory (2000, Inventário De Natal)
 31 Means Trouble (2001, 31)
 Kalkitos (2002)
 Canticle Of All Creatures (2006, Cântico Das Criaturas)

Feature films 
The Face You Deserve (2004)
Our Beloved Month of August (2008)
Tabu (2012)
Arabian Nights (2015)
The Tsugua Diaries (2021)

References

External links 
 

1972 births
Portuguese film directors
Living people
People from Lisbon
Lisbon Theatre and Film School alumni